Scott Charles Daniels (born 22 November 1969, in South Benfleet) is a former professional footballer who played league football as a defender.

Career

Daniels played for Football League clubs Colchester United, Exeter City, Northampton Town and non-league football for Dover Athletic, Ramsgate and Folkestone Invicta.

Honours

Club
Colchester United
 Football Conference runner-up (1): 1990–91

References

External links
 
 Scott Daniels at Colchester United Archive Database

1969 births
Living people
English footballers
Colchester United F.C. players
Exeter City F.C. players
Northampton Town F.C. players
Dover Athletic F.C. players
Ramsgate F.C. players
Folkestone Invicta F.C. players
People from South Benfleet
Association football defenders